Cornelius Edward Bahen (29 January 1909 – 29 December 1962) was an Australian rules footballer who played with St Kilda in the Victorian Football League (VFL).

Notes

External links 

1909 births
1962 deaths
Australian rules footballers from Melbourne
St Kilda Football Club players